The first series of the British reality-documentary series The Big Reunion began airing on ITV2 on 31 January 2013 until 28 March 2013. The show features chart-topping bands who were big names in the UK pop music scene between the 1990s and early 2000s, and the programme follows them as they reunite for the first time in a decade and go through their two weeks of intensive rehearsals before finally stepping back on stage for a comeback performance. The bands who reunited for the first series were Five, 911, Atomic Kitten, B*Witched, Honeyz and Liberty X. Blue also joined later on.

The Big Reunion proved to be an unexpected hit for ITV2, achieving both ratings and critical success. The first episode brought in 1.2 million viewers, becoming the channel's highest rated premiere in five years, and the show went on to achieve over 1 million viewers every week, making it one of the channel's most popular shows. Additionally, tickets for the bands' comeback went on sale shortly after the end of the premiere episode and sold out in under five minutes. Due to this, the producers of the show decided to announce a full UK arena tour. The tour took place in May 2013 and, along with other behind-the-scenes action, was broadcast on ITV2 from 5–19 September as The Big Reunion: On Tour. Also, a Christmas special called The Big Christmas Reunion aired on 12 December 2013. It featured the bands recording a Christmas charity single for Text Santa and looking at how Text Santa helps vulnerable people.

Production

Conception
On 18 October 2012, it was announced that pop groups Five, 911, Atomic Kitten, B*Witched, Honeyz and Liberty X—who were big names in the UK pop music scene in the 1990s and early 2000s—would be reuniting for an ITV2 documentary series entitled The Big Reunion, followed by a comeback performance at some point in 2013.

Personnel
The programme was ordered by Angela Jain, ITV's Director of Digital Channels, and Katy Thorogood, ITV's factual and daytime commissioner. ITV Studios' Kevin Lane acted as series producer, while creative director Michael Kelpie and Phil Mount acted as executive producers. Kelpie said: "To reunite these bands, tell the stories of what has happened to them since their heyday and follow them as they prepare to step back on the stage for the first time in a decade is a dream come true." Jain added, "We are thrilled to bring the stories of these pop groups up to date...A lot has happened in the time these bands have been apart - marriages, divorces and changes in careers - and who knows quite what will happen when they reunite!"

During rehearsals for the comeback performance and arena tour, Paul Domaine acted as the bands' choreographer, while Yvie Burnett, who formerly worked on The X Factor and currently works on The Voice UK, acted as their vocal coach.

Series overview

The Big Reunion
Filming for the show began in mid-2012, with the members of each band telling their individual stories about their bandmates and displaying their own personal lives nowadays, and later meeting together again for the first time in several years. Whilst all the other bands reunited several weeks before rehearsals began, Liberty X did not reunite until the night before, due to Michelle Heaton undergoing a double mastectomy. The rehearsals for the comeback performance took place at the Lilian Baylis Studio in London, beginning on 7 January 2013 and continuing for two weeks. Atomic Kitten's Kerry Katona was the last to arrive for rehearsals due to her being on This Morning talking about Dancing on Ice. The comeback performance took place at the Hammersmith Apollo on 26 February, and was broadcast on ITV2 on 28 March.

Atomic Kitten's three founding members, Katona, Liz McClarnon and Natasha Hamilton, took part in the show, even though it had previously been reported that their comeback was in doubt due to a fight between Katona and former member Jenny Frost, who replaced Katona when she initially left the group in 2001. Frost was unable to take part in the show due to her pregnancy. Honeyz's reformation came in the form of a third different line-up that consisted of founding members Célena Cherry and Heavenli Denton, and Mariama Goodman, who replaced Denton when she initially left the group in 1999, and vice versa when Goodman herself departed in 2000. Original member Naima Belkhiati decided not to take part in the reunion, so Cherry called up Goodman as her replacement. Additionally, Five only reunited as a four-piece as founding member Jason "J" Brown, who had attended previous meetings for the show, backed out at the last minute after claiming that he no longer wanted to be in the public eye. During filming for the show, the remaining four members, Abz Love, Sean Conlon, Ritchie Neville and Scott Robinson, discussed the possibility of auditioning a new fifth member. After they put out a notice, three people auditioned to join the band – ex-Northern Line member Dan Corsi, model and singer Luke Boyden, and Nathan Rawlings, who made it to judges' houses on The X Factor in 2010 as part of boy band The Reason 4. However all auditionees were unsuccessful. As a result, Five continued on with just the four of them.

The first three episodes featured Five, Liberty X, Atomic Kitten, 911, Honeyz and B*Witched telling their backstories of their time in their respective groups and about their lives since splitting up. The next two episodes featured the groups reuniting for the first time in a decade and discussing how they felt about performing again. The next three episodes were concerned with rehearsals for the comeback gig, midway through which Blue joined the show and told their stories as well. The final episode featured the sold-out comeback gig and backstage action.

When asked why they chose to join the comeback gig, Blue said: "Phil Mount, The Big Reunions producer, has always been a long time supporter of the band, giving us our first TV break, he really wanted us to be surprise special guests announced halfway through the series and to perform on the Hammersmith Apollo show. This sounded like a lot of fun, giving us the perfect chance to perform together again in the UK for our fans and reconnect with the other acts, many of whom friends of ours and started out around the same time as us. For us the 'Big Reunion' is a great chance for all of us bands to come together for one BIG party on Tuesday night!" Reaction to Blue joining The Big Reunion was initially negative among the other groups, as well as fans of the show, due to the fact that, unlike them, Blue were not reuniting, having already been back together since 2011 and represented the United Kingdom in the Eurovision Song Contest 2011.

The Big Reunion: On Tour and The Big Christmas Reunion
A three-week mini-series called The Big Reunion: On Tour aired in September 2013, featuring the bands as they embarked on their arena tour. Founding Five member Jason "J" Brown also returned to hit back at accusations made by his bandmates.

On 12 December 2013, a Christmas special called The Big Christmas Reunion aired. It featured the bands uniting to recording a cover of "I Wish It Could Be Christmas Everyday" for Text Santa. It gave an insight into the work undertaken by Text Santa charities Age UK, Barnardo's, BeatBullying, the British Heart Foundation, CLIC Sargent and Help the Hospices.

Bands
 Five (without Jason "J" Brown)
 911
 Atomic Kitten (original line-up) 
 B*Witched 
 Honeyz (Célena Cherry and Heavenli Denton from original line-up, Mariama Goodman from second line-up)
 Liberty X
 Blue (joined later during episode 7 and performed at some of the concerts)

Episodes

The Big Reunion
{| class="wikitable plainrowheaders" style="width: 100%; margin-right: 0;"
|- style="background:#FFAFFF; 
! No.
! Title
! Featured band(s)
! Written by
! Directed by
! Original air date
! UK viewers

|}

The Big Reunion: On Tour

The Big Christmas Reunion

Reception

Critical reception
After watching the first episode, which focused on the rises and falls of Five and Liberty X, Adam Postans of MSN said: "I'll be honest; I tuned in to this series opener to take the merciless mickey out of a bunch of pop has-been wannabes (come to think of it, 'Has-Been Wannabes' would have been a brilliant name for the losing quintet on the original ITV talent show, Popstars)...So I'm delighted and surprised to say that The Big Reunion wasn't the tiresome, drawn-out hour I'd assumed it would be..." Postans called it: "A surprisingly sober tale of the downfalls of being a pop star."

Of the second episode, which focused on the rises and falls of Atomic Kitten and 911, Caroline Frost of The Huffington Post said: "This week's 'The Big Reunion', bringing back together six girl-and boy bands for a one-off concert, concentrated on 911 and Atomic Kitten, which meant one thing - Kerry Katona-watch - but also a couple of harsh life lessons...This week's lessons - fame won't mend a broken heart, and success will challenge your friendships however robust they are, and turn the sweetest kitten into a clawing puss. And I still can't wait for Bew*tched to unravel their demons. Roll on next week of this car-crash guilty pleasure. Loving every minute."

Of the third episode, which focused on the rises and falls of B*Witched and Honeyz, Frost said: "This week's 'Big Reunion' showed the strength – AND shortfalls – of girl power, and shared two more of life's harsh lessons along the way."

Grace Dent, writing for The Independent, reviewed The Big Reunion very positively: "Sometime back in January a small TV brain-fart named The Big Reunion appeared on the schedule. Real low-rent reality TV fodder. The sort of thing I lap up at home with my ankles raised, eating noodles, while you are possibly ironing your own face to stay alert during that new Poliakoff five-parter. I won, however, and hooray for me, because The Big Reunion has been bloody fantastic." Dent went on to state that, "I am truly thankful that we live in an era when washed-up stars can make TV comebacks." Rosie Gizauskas from NOW magazine said that Five were the most "fascinating" band on the show.

Ratings
The first episode was seen by an average of 957,000 UK viewers, though it peaked at 1.2 million, making it ITV2's highest rated new show since Bionic Woman in 2008. The ratings increased for the second episode, which was watched by over 1.3 million, helping ITV2 finish third in the 9:00pm slot in front of BBC Two, Channel 4 and Channel 5. The overnight audience fell sharply to 670,000 for the third episode (but official figures were 941,000), being beaten in its timeslot by Junior Doctors: Your Life in Their Hands on BBC Three. Ratings continued to slide for episode 4, which overnight viewing figures showed was only watched by 630,000 viewers (less than half the audience of the episode of Celebrity Juice) that followed at 10:00pm, although the official rating was 826,000.  The sixth episode brought in 606,000 viewers when up against the series finale of Mayday on BBC One and UEFA Europa League coverage on ITV. 638,000 watched episode 7 and 593,000 watched episode 8. The ratings shot back up for the final episode, as an audience of 974,000 tuned in to watch the highlights and behind-the-scenes action of the Hammersmith Apollo concert. Official ratings show that with the addition of ITV2+1, The Big Reunion averaged over 1 million viewers every week.

References

External links
Official website

2013 British television seasons
2013 in British television